Hussein Mohammed Adam "Tanzania" was a Somali professor, originally from Hargeisa, Somaliland, but born and raised in Arusha, Tanzania. He graduated in 1966 with his undergraduate degree from Princeton University. Professor Hussein Tanzania gained his PhD in political science from Harvard University and a master's degree from Makerere University with his book "A Nation in Search of a Script". 

In addition to being a professor, he was a journalist and documentary maker. His most acclaimed documentary, "Limits to Submission," was about the consequences of the Ogaden War in 1977.

Academic background and publications

Professor Hussein M. Adam was a professor of political science at the College of the Holy Cross in the United States of America, specializing in comparative politics with a focus on the Horn of Africa. In the early 1970s, he served as the head of the Center of African Studies at Brandeis University. He was the founder and president of the Somali Studies International Association (SSIA) and was the founding director of the Somali Unit for Research on Emergency and Rural Development (SURERD), an indigenous NGO in Mogadishu (1981–87). Professor Adam Tanzania was a member of the African Studies Association, the World Bank Council of African Advisors, and the African Association of Political Science. During his life, he was the recipient of many research awards and grants, including the Hewlett Mellon Award at Harvard University, W. E. B. DuBois fellowship, De Witt Clinton Poole Memorial Prize, Rockefeller fellowship, and the African Development Foundation fellowship. His work was published in many reputable academics' journals, including African Affairs (Oxford University Press), Review of African Political Economy (Taylor & Francis), Journal of Islamic Studies (Oxford University Press), and Peace Review (Taylor & Francis).

During his lifetime, Professor Tanzania published many books and academic papers as a single author, editor and with other authors, including the following:

 From Tyranny to Anarchy: The Somali Experience.
 War Destroys, Peace Nurtures: Reconciliation and Development in Somalia.
 Removing barricades in Somalia: Options for peace and rehabilitation.
 Mending Rips in the Sky: Options for Somali Communities in the 21st Century.
 Rethinking the Somali Political Experience.
 The Revolutionary Development of the Somali Language.
 Towards a Somali institute of international affairs.
 Formation and Recognition of new states: Somaliland in contrast to Eritrea.
 Somalia: Militarism, Warlordism or Democracy?
 Frantz Fanon as a Democratic Theorist.
 Islam and Politics in Somalia.
 Somaliland: An African Struggle for Nationhood and International Recognition (A Book Review).
 Crisis in Somalia: Prospects for the future.
 Somali Civil Wars (Published by McGill-Queen's University Press).
 Clan conflicts and democratization in Somalia.

Death
Professor Hussein Tanzania died on 14 January 2017 in Boston, Massachusetts, United States.

References

Makerere University alumni
Princeton University alumni
Brandeis University faculty
College of the Holy Cross faculty
Harvard University alumni